Aethyr, æthyr, ethyr, or ayre may refer to:

In physics
 Aethyr, a formless and invisible medium or substance once hypothesized to pervade the cosmos; see aether theories

In metaphysics
 Aethyr, an element or spirit in many forms of metaphysics and occultism
 Aethyr, in the Enochian tradition, one of a succession of worlds (or "planes") viewed as surrounding, penetrating, and extending beyond the material world

In arts and entertainment
 Aethyr, in the DC Comics universe, a demon-like creature connected to the Phantom Zone 
 Aethyr, a fictional character on the fifth season of the television series Smallville

See also
Aether (disambiguation)
Ether